The Zurich Notebook is one of Albert Einstein's notebooks, from his time in Zurich.  It contains much of the basic work for general relativity.

References

External links
 http://www.pitt.edu/~jdnorton/Goodies/Zurich_Notebook/

20th-century manuscripts
German manuscripts
Swiss manuscripts
Notebooks
Culture of Zürich
Science and technology in Switzerland
Works by Albert Einstein
General relativity